MS Torrens was a Norwegian cargo motor ship built in 1939 by Kockums Mek.Verksted AB., Malmö, Sweden, for Wilhelm Wilhelmsen, Tønsberg, Norway. In 1940, after the German invasion of Norway, the ship operated for the Norwegian Shipping and Trade Mission (Nortraship) in London. Voyages in early 1940 involved U.S. Atlantic ports and the Philippines, China and Japan. By mid 1940 the operations tended to be out of U.S. Pacific coast ports, with occasional visits to the Atlantic, to the same destinations. The same pattern repeated in 1941.

With entry of the United States into the war Torrens was transferred to the U.S. War Shipping Administration (WSA) on 23 January 1942. The ship was allocated to Army requirements until 22 January 1946. The ship first operated as a cargo ship but was converted into a troop ship with a capacity for 1,702 passengers. Until June 1945 Torrens operated in the Southwest Pacific theater. After June 1945 the ship operated to Europe until January 1946 when released from troop transport service and returned to Nortraship on 22 January 1946.

After return to owners the ship was eventually sold in 1966 to a firm in Piraeus, Greece and renamed Georgios M. The ship was sold to Chinese scrappers in 1970 and scrapped in April of that year.

Construction and characteristics 
Torrens was built by Kockums Mek.Verksted AB., Malmö, Sweden, as yard number 209 for the Norwegian shipping company Wilhelm Wilhelmsen, Tønsberg, Norway. The ship was launched 5 April 1939 and delivered to the owner on 31 May 1939. Registered dimensions were  registry length,  beam and  depth,  molded depth and  draught.

Service history

Background 
Torrens was delivered to the owner on 31 May 1939 and Germany invaded Poland on 1 September 1939 then Norway on 9 April 1940. The ship thus had a very brief peacetime commercial service. Unlike vessels of occupied countries with no government in exile Norwegian ships that escaped the occupation were not subject to seizure of the belligerents and later by the United States. The Norwegian government in exile in London established the Norwegian Shipping and Trade Mission (Nortraship) and requisitioned all Norwegian ships to maintain the Norwegian flag at sea. Torrens operated under Nortraship until on 23 January 1942, with the United States entering the war, the ship was delivered by Nortraship to the War Shipping Administration.

Before Pacific War 
The ship's schedule for 1940 shows continual voyages between U.S. Atlantic ports, with occasional visits to U.S. Pacific coast ports, and western Pacific Ports. Such a sequence is seen with the ship departing Manila on 28 February for New York arriving on 6 April. From New York on 17 April the ship put into Boston, back to New York, to Hampton Roads, Savannah then through the Panama Canal to Los Angeles and arriving back in Manila 9 June 1940. From June until return to Los Angeles on 20 August Torrens made trips between Manila, Shanghai, Hong Kong and Yokohama. The ship departed Los Angeles 21 August bound for the U.S. Atlantic coast ports of New York, Philadelphia and Hampton Roads before heading for Manila by way of Los Angeles. After an 18 October 1940 departure from Los Angeles Torrens repeated the western Pacific port calls arriving in Yokohama on New Year's Day 1941. On 3 January 1941 the ship again headed for New York by way of Los Angeles. The pattern was similar during 1941 until 4 December 1941 with the ship's arrival in Los Angeles from New York. The next voyage, departing Los Angeles on 7 February 1942 was a wartime voyage for Brisbane after Torrens was transferred from Nortraship to the War Shipping Administration (WSA) on 23 January at San Pedro, California.

War in the Pacific

Transfer to War Shipping Administration (WSA) 
Torrens was one of WSA's foreign registered vessels. Many had been seized while others with friendly governments in exile were cooperatively incorporated into the effort, including operation of the ship by the ship's normal crew or other nationals. Torrens was placed in operation under a U.S. Army Transportation Corps Agreement (TCA) and management by WSA agents; from 23 January 1941 to 17 October 1944 by Barber Steamship Lines, Inc. and from then until 22 January 1946 and release to Nortraship by American West African Line.

A description of the ship's company is given by members of the Fifth Special Naval Construction Battalion, elements of which embarked at Port Hueneme, California on 26 October 1944, for Milne Bay. The ship's company was "cosmopolitan" under the ship's peace time Captain, Thor Bruu, who held a commission in the Royal Norwegian Naval Reserve and held command from 30 May 1930 to 20 October 1945. The ship's officers and gun crews were regular Norwegian Navy or Naval Reserve. The Norwegian contingent manning the guns, a  cannon forward,  cannon aft and plentiful Oerlikon 20 mm cannon, consisted of one officer, a quartermaster and twelve gunners. U.S. Navy Armed Guard furnished communications and crew was supplemented by members of the U.S. Merchant Marine.

Ships operating either as Army assets or allocated to Army under charter arrangements carried Transportation Corps officers representing the Army's Port of Embarkation Commander through which the ship operated. On troop ships the individual was designated the "transport commander" who represented the Port Commander. The transport commander was in command of all Army personnel assigned to the transport and all military personnel embarked as passengers, but not of the ship or ship's personnel.

WSA operations 

The first voyage under WSA was bound for the Southwest Pacific where the United States was building up forces in Australia as the Philippines were cut off. The Pensacola Convoy had been diverted there while at sea on 7 December 1941. Departing Los Angeles on 7 February Torens joined a convoy at San Francisco bound on 12 February for the Australian ports of Brisbane, Townsville, Australia, Sydney, Hobart and Wellington, New Zealand. That convoy, 2033 escorted by the cruiser , included the other merchant ships Cape Alva, Pennant, Perida and the Navy tanker . Torrens had included in the cargo 40 P-400 Airacobras, 30 P-40E Warhawks and 3 A-20A Havocs.

The ship was converted in six weeks at Bethlehem Steel Company, San Francisco, to serve as a troop transport with a capacity for 1,702 passengers.  It also had a remaining  cargo capacity. After that conversion Torrens made a voyage with troops from San Francisco, location of the San Francisco Port of Embarkation, in October 1942 to Townsville with return to San Francisco on 20 December. From that point all Pacific voyages began and ended at San Francisco.

Torrens made a 9 January 1943 voyage to Nouméa, New Caledonia, Lautoka, Fiji and Apia, Samoa returning early in March. Two more voyages only to Nouméa were followed by returns in July to Australian and New Guinea ports. A final 1943 voyage, departing in October, saw a return to Nouméa with additional ports at Espiritu Santo then Auckland and Wellington in New Zealand before returning in December 1943. By 1944 the ship was sailing independently of convoy schedules. In early February 1944 Torrens made a voyage to Espiritu Santo, Guadalcanal and Auckland with return to San Francisco before beginning a five month stay in the Southwest Pacific. During that stay Torrens made ports recently opened during the New Guinea campaign including Milne Bay, Finschhafen, Oro Bay, Lae, Hollandia, Wakde, Humboldt Bay before return to San Francisco in September by way of New Zealand and Nouméa.

In a deviation from the usual sailing from San Francisco directly for destinations across the Pacific Torrens made a stop to embark elements of Naval Construction Battalions at Port Hueneme, California on 26 October 1944. That voyage eventually included Milne Bay, two calls at Hollandia, Biak and Lae but also the still active war zone of Leyte in the Philippines where landings had begun on 17 October. The voyage is described by the embarked members of the Fifth Special Naval Construction Battalion, destined for Milne Bay, and the Thirty-Third Special Naval Construction Battalion destined for Leyte. The accounts note there were about 1,700 aboard with the usual duties supplementing the ship's crew at the 20mm antiaircraft armament, communications, the long lines for two meals and lunch sandwiches. The ship crossed the Equator on 5 November with the usual ceremonies for first timers. The next day the ship crossed the International Date Line. The route skirted Guadalcanal and passed through the Bismarck Archipelago giving sight of the small islands with arrival at Milne Bay 11 November for disembarkation. The Fifth Special NCB remained at Milne Bay but the 33rd reboarded Torrens after a few days bound in convoy for Leyte. with air attacks expected.

The convoy of some 40 ships came under air attack during 5 and 6 December, some ships were damaged and Torrens was credited with shooting down one attacker. Embarked personnel collected money "in appreciation of their excellent performance shooting down the Jap dive bomber yesterday". The funds were then donated by Captain Bruu to the Norwegian consulate in San Francisco to be used for the Norwegian Destroyer Foundation. The ship departed Leyte on 22 December stopping at Hollandia and Biak where some 1,000 members of the 55th NCB and some pilots returning to the United States embarked. With another stop at Lae where 300 wounded embarked, Torrens departed the Southwest Pacific for San Francisco on 5 January 1945 arriving 21 January. Torrens made a final voyage in the Pacific beginning in February that included some of the old ports but the newly liberated Manila by April 1945 with a return to San Francisco with stops in the by then backwaters of the Pacific war on 14 May 1945.

On 15 June 1945 the ship departed San Francisco and the Pacific, transiting the Panama Canal, for Le Havre, France returning to New York City in July. Torrens then went to Livorno and Naples, Italy, back to New York, apparently by the Suez Canal, the Pacific and Panama Canal on a voyage from 7 August to 19 August. Two more trips were made to Le Havre returning to New York and then Marseilles, France with return to Hampton Roads before a voyage from Hampton Roads to the Suez and Karachi with return to New York. On 20 December 1945 the ship departed New York for the Panama Canal and Okinawa with a return to San Francisco on 7 January 1946. Torrens was released from troop transport duties at San Francisco on 9 January and on 22 January 1946 returned to the Norwegian Shipping and Trade Mission.

Return to commercial service 
On 9 March Torrens departed San Francisco for New York, arriving 23 March. The ship served again with Wilhelm Wilhelmsen until sold 3 June 1966 to Dimitra Cia. Nav. S. A. of Piraeus, Greece and transferred to Greek registry as Georgios M. The ship was sold in 1970 and delivered to a Chinese firm for scrapping 13 April 1970 at Hsin Kang, People's Republic of China.

See also 
 Norwegian Shipping and Trade Mission (Nortraship)

Footnotes

References

Bibliography

External links 
 Torrens photos
 M/S Torrens — Warsailor,  Voyage Record From June-1942 to Aug.-1945 (links to convoys with ship listing)
 Thor Bruu, in command of Torrens 30 May 1930 to 20 October 1945

1939 ships
Ships built in Malmö
Merchant ships of Norway
Troop ships of the War Shipping Administration